Timuçin Şahin (born 3 February 1973) is a Turkish jazz guitarist and composer. He was awarded first prize at the Dutch Jazz Competition in 2001 and second prizes at the Jur Naessens Music Award in 2002, and the Deloitte Jazz Award in 2006. He has so far released five contemporary jazz albums, including solo releases, as part of the contemporary jazz trio On the Line, and as part of the Timucin Sahin Quartet and the Timucin Sahin Quintet.

Career
Şahin started playing guitar when he was 16 years old. In 1992 he began studying jazz guitar with Joe Pass and John Abercombie at Hilversum Conservatory in Rotterdam, Holland. He went on to study classical composition with Daan Manneke at the Amsterdam Conservatory, and with and George Crumb at the Manhattan School of Music in New York.

He has played and recorded with Randy Brecker, Greg Osby, Robin Eubanks, Kai Eckhardt, Mike Mainieri, Mark Turner, Tony Moreno, Ernst Reizeger, Armando Gola, Donny McCaslin, Tyshawn Sorey, Thomas Morgan, Sean Rickman, Marcel Wierckx and Owen Hart Jr.

He has developed his own double necked guitar, on which he combines Indian scales and African rhythms with Western jazz improvisation. Currently, Şahin is a PhD candidate in composition at New York University.

Awards and recognition
2001: first prize, Dutch Jazz Competition, On the Line
2002: second prize for his composition Occult at the Jur Naessens Music Award
2006: second prize in the Deloitte Jazz Award, performing with the Concertgebouw Jazz Orchestra, Amsterdam

Discography
On the Line: The Unexpected, 2001
Slick Road (with Robin Eubanks, Hein van de Geyn, Afra Mussawisade and B.C. Manjunath), 2003
Window for my breath (with Kai Eckhardt and Owen Hart Jr.), 2005
Amsterdam, de Wereld (KLR014):  Elif'e Mektuplar [5'] soprano, bass clarinet, violoncello
Bafa (with John O'Gallagher, Tyshawn Sorey, and Thomas Morgan), 2009
Inherence (with John O'Gallagher, Tyshawn Sorey, Christopher Tordini, and Ralph Alessi), 2013

References

External links

Turkish jazz musicians
Jazz guitarists
Living people
1973 births
21st-century guitarists